Ewald Walch (born 18 August 1940 in Innsbruck) was an Austrian luger who competed from the mid-1950s to the early 1970s. Competing in two Winter Olympics, he won the silver medal in the men's doubles event at the 1968 Winter Olympics in Grenoble.

Walch also won seven medals in the men's doubles event at the FIL World Luge Championships with three golds (1960, 1969, 1970), two silvers (1967, 1971), and two bronzes (1957, 1963). He also won a complete set of  medals in the men's doubles event at the FIL European Luge Championships with a gold in 1962, a silver in 1971, and a bronze in 1970.

References

1940 births
Living people
Austrian male lugers
Olympic lugers of Austria
Olympic silver medalists for Austria
Lugers at the 1968 Winter Olympics
Lugers at the 1972 Winter Olympics
Olympic medalists in luge
Medalists at the 1968 Winter Olympics
Sportspeople from Innsbruck